The 1970 New Orleans Saints season was the team's fourth as a member of the National Football League. After spending their first three seasons in the NFL's Eastern Conference, the Saints moved in 1970 to the West Division of the new National Football Conference. They failed to improve on their previous season's output  winning only two games. The team failed to qualify for the playoffs for the fourth consecutive season.

The victory over the Lions was last of the season for the Saints, but both victories came over teams in the thick of the NFC playoff race. The other, a  triumph over the New York Giants in week three, cost the Giants the NFC East division championship. The Lions qualified for the playoffs as the wild card from the NFC, but were nearly forced into a coin toss with the Dallas Cowboys, a situation which was only averted when the Giants lost their season finale to the Los Angeles Rams.

Offseason

NFL draft

Personnel

Staff

Roster

Schedule 

Note: Intra-division opponents are in bold text.

Standings

Quotes 
Al Wester of WWL Radio describes Tom Dempsey's 63-yard field goal against the Detroit Lions.

Don Criqui describing the same play for CBS:

References 

New Orleans Saints seasons
New Orleans Saints
New Orl